Acacia torulosa is a shrub or tree belonging to the genus Acacia and the subgenus Juliflorae that is native to north eastern Australia.

One common name is "Thancoupie".

Description
It has brown to grey coloured bark that become flaky with age. The glabrous are angled to terete. Like most species of Acacia it has phyllodes rather than true leaves. They are scurfy when mature and have a prominent midnerve and one or two more prominent nerves. It blooms between March and July producing golden flowers. The glabrous and linear seed pods that form after flowering and resemble a string of beads that are convex over the seeds. The dark brown seeds within the pods are arranged longitudinally.

Distribution
It is endemic to the tropical areas of the Northern Territory and Queensland where it is often situated on rocky hillsides or around beaches or watercourses growing in alluvial sandy soils as a part of Eucalyptus woodland or mixed shrubland communities.

See also
List of Acacia species

References

torulosa
Flora of Queensland
Flora of the Northern Territory
Taxa named by George Bentham
Plants described in 1859